Cueva del Milodón Natural Monument is a Natural Monument located in the Chilean Patagonia,  northwest of Puerto Natales and  north of Punta Arenas.

The monument is situated along the flanks of Cerro Benitez.  It comprises several caves and a rock formation called Silla del Diablo (Devil's Chair). The monument includes a cave which is notable for the discovery in 1895 of skin, bones and other parts of a ground sloth called Mylodon darwini, from which the cave takes its name. It is also part of the End of the World Route, a scenic touristic route.

Milodón Cave 
It was discovered in 1895 by Hermann Eberhard, German explorer of Patagonia. He found a large, seemingly fresh piece of skin of an unidentified animal. In 1896 the cave was explored by Otto Nordenskjöld and later it was recognized that the skin belonged to Mylodon – an extinct animal which died 10,200–13,560 years ago.

In the cave and other caves of the monument have been found remnants of other extinct animals and human remnants.

It became extinct at the end of the Pleistocene Epoch.

Mylodon remains 
Investigations determined the survival of the Mylodon until about 5,000 years ago and confirmed the existence of other animals, such as the "Dwarf Horse" Hippidion, the saber-toothed cat Smilodon and the litoptern Macrauchenia

Human remains 
Diverse elements of human habitation are found at Cueva del Milodón including fire-fractured rock, lithic tools and human remains. Human habitation at Cueva del Milodón is dated as early as 6000 BC.

Panorama

See also 
 Cerro Toro
 Eberhard Fjord
 Martin Gusinde Anthropological Museum
 Hippidion saldiasi

References 

Milodon
Protected areas of Magallanes Region
Archaeological sites in Chile
Natural monuments of Chile
Paleontology in Chile
Pleistocene paleontological sites of South America
1895 in paleontology
Landforms of Magallanes Region
Última Esperanza Province
Geology of Magallanes Region